The Illustrated Weekly of India was an English-language weekly newsmagazine publication in India. It started publication in 1880 (as Times of India Weekly Edition; later renamed as The Illustrated Weekly of India in 1923) and ceasing publication in 1993. Also simply known as Weekly by its readership, The Illustrated Weekly of India was considered to be an important English-language publication in India for more than a century.

The magazine was edited by Sean Mandy, A. S. Raman, Khushwant Singh, M. V. Kamath, and Pritish Nandy. A. S. Raman was the first Indian editor of The Illustrated Weekly of India, succeeding Sean Mandy. Khushwant Singh took over as editor nearly a year after Raman's formal departure. In between, assistant editor Subrata Banerjee edited the magazine for about 20 months. Cartoons in the latter half of the magazine were by R. K. Laxman and Mario Miranda. It is now defunct, having closed down on 13 November 1993.

Many young students of English used it as a regular reading and guide for honing English language skills in vernacular India.

Closing of The Illustrated Weekly of India

In 1993, the publication industry became intensely competitive and the magazines published by The Times of India were losing money. Samir Jain, The owner of the Times of India group, decided to end the publication of The Illustrated Weekly of India, Dharmyug, and similar magazines to focus on revitalisation of the newspapers. The move was widely criticised, however Samir Jain was able to turn the fortunes of Times of India around.

References

External links

 Illustrated Weekly of India on Microfilm at Times Group website

Defunct magazines published in India
English-language magazines published in India
Magazines established in 1880
Magazines disestablished in 1993
Mass media in Mumbai
News magazines published in India
Publications of The Times Group
Weekly magazines published in India